Antrain (Gallo: Antrein) is a former commune in the Ille-et-Vilaine department in the Brittany in northwestern France. On 1 January 2019, it was merged into the new commune Val-Couesnon. Château de Bonnefontaine dates to the second quarter of the 16th century.

Population

Inhabitants of Antrain are called Antrenais in French.

See also
Communes of the Ille-et-Vilaine department

References

External links

 

Former communes of Ille-et-Vilaine